Protaetia speciosa is a beetle of the family Scarabaeidae and subfamily Cetoniinae.

Description
The basic colour of the body is golden-green, sometimes bright red. Adults can be found from May to October, with a peak in June–August. These beetles feed primarily on tree sap and fruits. The larvae develop in rotten wood of deciduous trees, mainly oak and willow. The full life cycle lasts 3.4 years.

Distribution
This flower beetle is present in the Near East, in northern Iraq, Syria, northern Iran, Georgia, Armenia, Azerbaijan, Turkmenistan, Ukraine and Russia and Romania.

Habitat
This beetle lives in deciduous forests, in plains and mountains.

Subspecies
 Protaetia speciosa cyanochlora Schauer, 1941
 Protaetia speciosa jousselini (Gory & Percheron, 1833)
 Protaetia speciosa speciosa (Adams, 1817)
 Protaetia speciosa venusta (Ménétriès, 1836)

References
Biolib
Fauna europaea
Zipcodezoo

External links
Protaetia (Cetonischema) speciosa (Adams, 1817) - photo by A.S. Vlasenko
Protaetia (Cetonischema) speciosa jousselini

Cetoniinae
Beetles described in 1817